Abithana Chintamani is an encyclopedia of Tamil literature written by A. Singaravelu Mudaliar (1855 - 28 January 1931). This is the first encyclopedia of Tamil literature. The first edition, which contains a recommendation dated 1899 by V. Kanakasabai Pillai, appeared in 1910 and contained 1050 pages. The second edition, containing 1634 pages, appeared posthumously in 1934, with a preface by the author's son, and is available as reprints.

History
The Fourth Tamil Sangam, a Tamil language academy, was formed in Madurai on 14 September 1901. It was founded by Pandithurai Thevar of the royal family of Sethupathis of Ramanathapuram. Thevar was seeking to publish an encyclopedia of Tamil literature. Meanwhile, Singaravelu Mudaliyar, a Tamil pandit working at Pachaiyappa's College, Chennai had completed such a work, but had difficulties finding a publisher. Pandithurai Thevar heard about the work and supported the publication of the work financially.

In the preface, Singaravelu Mudaliyar says:

See also
 Agastyar
 Avaiyar

References

External links
 Project Madurai Homepage

Tamil language encyclopedias
Encyclopedias of literature
Indian encyclopedias
1910 non-fiction books
1934 non-fiction books
20th-century encyclopedias
20th-century Indian books